Jagananna Vidya Deevena is a program launched by the Government of Andhra Pradesh to encourage students hailing from poor economic backgrounds to pursue higher education by reimbursing full fee which includes the tuition, special and examination fees.

Development 
Jagananna Vidya Deevena was announced by state's Information and Public Relations minister Perni Venkataramaiah (Nani) on 27 November 2019 with a budget of 3400 crores per year. It benefits 11,87,904 students from the poor households of the state. Chief minister Y. S. Jagan Mohan Reddy officially launched the scheme on 24 February 2020. For the academic year of 2020–21, ₹671.45 crores were deposited in the accounts of 10,88,439 beneficiary's mothers in the first installment and ₹693.81 crores were deposited in the second installment benefiting 10.97 lakh students.

As of April 2021, The total of ₹4,879 crores were spent for the scheme.

The scheme 
The scheme was launched to financially assist students hailing from poor social and economic backgrounds by reimbursing their total fee. The scheme covers students pursuing ITI, polytechnic, degree, B Tech, MBA, MCA, pharmacy and other courses. Under this scheme, Government of Andhra Pradesh deposits money into the accounts of beneficiary's mother every three months. State government has made 75% attendance as mandatory to avail the scheme.

References 

2020 establishments in Andhra Pradesh
Government welfare schemes in Andhra Pradesh
Education in Andhra Pradesh